Fabien Delrue (born 22 June 2000) is a French badminton player. He won the European junior championships in boys' and mixed doubles events in 2018 and won another gold in team event also. He was also the bronze medalist in European U17 Championships team event in 2016.

Achievements

European Junior Championships 
Boys' doubles

Mixed doubles

BWF International Challenge/Series (3 titles, 1 runner-up) 
Men's doubles

Mixed doubles

  BWF International Challenge tournament
  BWF International Series tournament
  BWF Future Series tournament

BWF Junior International (4 titles, 7 runners-up) 
Boys' doubles

Mixed doubles

  BWF Junior International Grand Prix tournament
  BWF Junior International Challenge tournament
  BWF Junior International Series tournament
  BWF Junior Future Series tournament

References

External links 

2000 births
Living people
People from Sarcelles
Sportspeople from Val-d'Oise
French male badminton players
21st-century French people